Nuclear marine propulsion is propulsion of a ship or submarine with heat provided by a nuclear reactor. The power plant heats water to produce steam for a turbine used to turn the ship's propeller through a gearbox or through an electric generator and motor. Nuclear propulsion is used primarily within naval warships such as nuclear submarines and supercarriers. A small number of experimental civil nuclear ships have been built.

Compared to oil- or coal-fuelled ships, nuclear propulsion offers the advantages of very long intervals of operation before refueling. All the fuel is contained within the nuclear reactor, so no cargo or supplies space is taken up by fuel, nor is space taken up by exhaust stacks or combustion air intakes. The low fuel cost is offset by high operating costs and investment in infrastructure however, so nearly all nuclear-powered vessels are military.

Power plants

Basic operation of naval ship or submarine

Most naval nuclear reactors are of the pressurized water type, with the exception of a few attempts at using liquid sodium-cooled reactors. A primary water circuit transfers heat generated from nuclear fission in the fuel to a steam generator; this water is kept under pressure so it does not boil. Any radioactive contamination in the primary water is confined. Water is circulated by pumps; at lower power levels, reactors designed for submarines may rely on natural circulation of the water to reduce noise generated by the pumps.

The hot water from the reactor heats a separate water circuit in the steam generator.  That water is converted to steam and passes through steam driers on its way to the steam turbine. Spent steam at low pressure runs through a condenser cooled by seawater and returns to liquid form.  The water is pumped back to the steam generator and continues the cycle. Any water lost in the process can be made up by desalinated sea water added to the steam generator feed water.

In the turbine, the steam expands and reduces its pressure as it imparts energy to the rotating blades of the turbine.  There may be many stages of rotating blades and fixed guide vanes.  The output shaft of the turbine may be connected to a gearbox to reduce rotation speed, then a shaft connects to the vessel's propellers. In another form of drive system, the turbine turns an electrical generator, and the electric power produced is fed to one or more drive motors for the vessel's propellers. The Russian, U.S. and British navies rely on  direct steam turbine propulsion, while French and Chinese ships use the turbine to generate electricity for propulsion (turbo-electric transmission).

Some nuclear submarines have a single reactor, but Russian submarines have two, and so had . Most American aircraft carriers are powered by two reactors, but  had eight. The majority of marine reactors are of the pressurized water type, although the U.S. and Soviet navies have designed warships powered with liquid metal cooled reactors.

Differences from land power plants
Marine-type reactors differ from land-based commercial electric power reactors in several respects.

While land-based reactors in nuclear power plants produce up to around 1600 megawatts of net electrical power (the nameplate capacity of the EPR), a typical marine propulsion reactor produces no more than a few hundred megawatts. Some small modular reactors (SMR) are similar to marine propulsion reactors in capacity and some design considerations and thus nuclear marine propulsion (whether civilian or military) is sometimes proposed as an additional market niche for SMRs. Unlike for land-based applications where hundreds of acres can be occupied by installations like Bruce Nuclear Generating Station, at sea tight space limits dictate that a marine reactor must be physically small, so it must generate higher power per unit of space. This means its components are subject to greater stresses than those of a land-based reactor. Its mechanical systems must operate flawlessly under the adverse conditions encountered at sea, including vibration and the pitching and rolling of a ship operating in rough seas. Reactor shutdown mechanisms cannot rely on gravity to drop control rods into place as in a land-based reactor that always remains upright. Salt water corrosion is an additional problem that complicates maintenance.

As the core of a seagoing reactor is much smaller than a power reactor, the probability of a neutron intersecting with a fissionable nucleus before it escapes into the shielding is much lower. As such, the fuel is typically more highly enriched (i.e., contains a higher concentration of 235U vs. 238U) than that used in a land-based nuclear power plant, which increases the probability of fission to the level where a sustained reaction can occur. Some marine reactors run on relatively low-enriched uranium, which requires more frequent refueling. Others run on highly enriched uranium, varying from 20% 235U, to the over 96% 235U found in U.S. submarines, in which the resulting smaller core is quieter in operation (a big advantage to a submarine). Using more-highly enriched fuel also increases the reactor's power density and extends the usable life of the nuclear fuel load, but is more expensive and a greater risk to nuclear proliferation than less-highly enriched fuel.

A marine nuclear propulsion plant must be designed to be highly reliable and self-sufficient, requiring minimal maintenance and repairs, which might have to be undertaken many thousands of miles from its home port. One of the technical difficulties in designing fuel elements for a seagoing nuclear reactor is the creation of fuel elements that will withstand a large amount of radiation damage. Fuel elements may crack over time and gas bubbles may form. The fuel used in marine reactors is a metal-zirconium alloy rather than the ceramic UO2 (uranium dioxide) often used in land-based reactors. Marine reactors are designed for long core life, enabled by the relatively high enrichment of the uranium and by incorporating a "burnable poison" in the fuel elements, which is slowly depleted as the fuel elements age and become less reactive. The gradual dissipation of the "nuclear poison" increases the reactivity of the core to compensate for the lessening reactivity of the aging fuel elements, thereby extending the usable life of the fuel. The compact reactor pressure vessel is provided with an internal neutron shield, which reduces the damage to the steel from constant neutron bombardment.

Decommissioning
Decommissioning nuclear-powered submarines has become a major task for U.S. and Russian navies. After defuelling, U.S. practice is to cut the reactor section from the vessel for disposal in shallow land burial as low-level waste (see the ship-submarine recycling program). In Russia, whole vessels, or sealed reactor sections, typically remain stored afloat, although a new facility near Sayda Bay is to provide storage in a concrete-floored facility on land for some submarines in the far north.

Future designs
Russia built a floating nuclear power plant for its far eastern territories. The design has two 35 MWe units based on the KLT-40 reactor used in icebreakers (with refueling every four years). Some Russian naval vessels have been used to supply electricity for domestic and industrial use in remote far eastern and Siberian towns.

In 2010, Lloyd's Register was investigating the possibility of civilian nuclear marine propulsion and rewriting draft rules (see text under Merchant Ships).

Civil liability
Insurance of nuclear vessels is not like the insurance of conventional ships. The consequences of an accident could span national boundaries, and the magnitude of possible damage is beyond the capacity of private insurers. A special international agreement, the Brussels Convention on the Liability of Operators of Nuclear Ships, developed in 1962, would have made signatory national governments liable for accidents caused by nuclear vessels under their flag but was never ratified owing to disagreement on the inclusion of warships under the convention. Nuclear reactors under United States jurisdiction are insured by the provisions of the Price–Anderson Act.

Military nuclear ships

By 1990, there were more nuclear reactors powering ships (mostly military) than there were generating electric power in commercial power plants worldwide.

Under the direction of U.S. Navy Captain (later Admiral) Hyman G. Rickover, the design, development and production of nuclear marine propulsion plants started in the United States in the 1940s. The first prototype naval reactor was constructed and tested at the Naval Reactor Facility at the National Reactor Testing Station in Idaho (now called the Idaho National Laboratory) in 1953.

Submarines 

The first nuclear submarine, put to sea in 1955 (SS was a traditional designation for U.S. submarines, while SSN denoted the first "nuclear" submarine).

The Soviet Union also developed nuclear submarines. The first types developed were the Project 627, NATO-designated  with two water-cooled reactors, the first of which, K-3 Leninsky Komsomol, was underway under nuclear power in 1958.

Nuclear power revolutionized the submarine, finally making it a true "underwater" vessel, rather than a "submersible" craft, which could only stay underwater for limited periods. It gave the submarine the ability to operate submerged at high speeds, comparable to those of surface vessels, for unlimited periods, dependent only on the endurance of its crew. To demonstrate this  was the first vessel to execute a submerged circumnavigation of the Earth (Operation Sandblast), doing so in 1960.

By 1962, the United States Navy had 26 operational nuclear submarines and another 30 under construction. Nuclear power had revolutionized the Navy. The United States shared its technology with the United Kingdom, while French, Soviet, Indian and Chinese development proceeded separately.

After the Skate-class vessels, U.S. submarines were powered by a series of standardized, single-reactor designs built by Westinghouse and General Electric. Rolls-Royce plc built similar units for Royal Navy submarines, eventually developing a modified version of their own, the PWR-2 (pressurized water reactor).

The largest nuclear submarines ever built are the 26,500 tonne Russian . The smallest nuclear warships to date are the 2,700 tonne French  attack submarines. The U.S. Navy operated an unarmed nuclear submarine, the NR-1 Deep Submergence Craft, between 1969 and 2008, which was not a combat vessel but was the smallest nuclear-powered submarine at 400 tons.

Aircraft carriers 

The United States and France have built nuclear aircraft carriers.

 The United States Navy have a much broader experience. , in service 1962–2012, powered by eight reactor units, is still the only aircraft carrier to house more than two nuclear reactors, with each A2W reactor taking the place of one of the conventional boilers in earlier constructions.

French Navy 

The French Navy operates one carrier  equipped with catapults and arresters. The  is a 42,000 tonne nuclear-powered aircraft carrier, commissioned in 2001 and is the flagship of the French Navy (Marine Nationale). The ship carries a complement of Dassault Rafale M and E‑2C Hawkeye aircraft, EC725 Caracal and AS532 Cougar helicopters for combat search and rescue, as well as modern electronics and Aster missiles.

United States Navy 
The United States Navy operates 11 carriers, all nuclear-powered:
: ten 101,000-ton, 1,092 ft long fleet carriers, the first of which was commissioned in 1975.
, one 110,000-ton, 1,106 ft long fleet carrier. The lead of the class , came into service in 2017, with another nine planned.

Destroyers and cruisers

Russian Navy 

The Kirov class, Soviet designation 'Project 1144 Orlan' (sea eagle), is a class of nuclear-powered guided-missile cruisers of the Soviet Navy and Russian Navy, the largest and heaviest surface combatant warships (i.e. not an aircraft carrier or amphibious assault ship) in operation in the world. Among modern warships, they are second in size only to large aircraft carriers, and of similar size to a World War II era battleships. The Soviet classification of the ship-type is "heavy nuclear-powered guided missile cruiser". The ships are often referred to as battlecruisers by Western defence commentators due to their size and general appearance.

United States Navy 

The United States Navy at one time had nuclear-powered cruisers as part of its fleet. The first such ship was USS Long Beach (CGN-9). Commissioned in 1961, she was the world's first nuclear-powered surface combatant. She was followed a year later by USS Bainbridge (DLGN-25). While Long Beach was designed and built as a cruiser, Bainbridge began life as a frigate, though at that time the Navy was using the hull code "DLGN" for "destroyer leader, guided missile, nuclear". 

Ultimately, all these ships proved to be too costly to maintain and they were all retired between 1993 and 1999.

Other military ships

Communication and command ships 

SSV-33 Ural  (ССВ-33 Урал; NATO reporting name: Kapusta [Russian for "cabbage"]) was a command and control naval ship operated by the Soviet Navy. SSV-33s hull was derived from that of the nuclear-powered s with nuclear marine propulsion. SSV-33 served in electronic intelligence, missile tracking, space tracking, and communications relay roles. Due to high operating costs, SSV-33 was laid up.

SSV-33 carried only light defensive weapons. These were two AK-176 76 mm guns, four AK-630 30 mm guns, and four quadruple Igla missile mounts.

Nuclear-powered UUV 

The Poseidon ("Poseidon", NATO reporting name Kanyon), previously known by Russian codename Status-6, is a nuclear-powered and nuclear-armed unmanned underwater vehicle under development by Rubin Design Bureau, capable of delivering both conventional and nuclear payloads. According to Russian state TV, it is able to deliver a thermonuclear cobalt bomb of up to 200 megatonnes (four times as powerful as the most powerful device ever detonated, the Tsar Bomba, and twice its maximum theoretical yield) against an enemy's naval ports and coastal cities.

Civilian nuclear ships

The following are ships that are or were in commercial or civilian use and have nuclear marine propulsion.

Merchant ships
Nuclear-powered civil merchant ships have not developed beyond a few experimental ships. The U.S.-built , completed in 1962, was primarily a demonstration of civil nuclear power and was too small and expensive to operate economically as a merchant ship. The design was too much of a compromise, being neither an efficient freighter nor a viable passenger liner. It proved too expensive to operate and was converted to diesel. The Japanese , completed in 1972, was dogged by technical and political problems. Its reactor had significant radiation leakage and fishermen protested against the vessel's operation. All of these three ships used low-enriched uranium. Sevmorput, a Soviet and later Russian LASH carrier with icebreaking capability, has operated successfully on the Northern Sea Route since it was commissioned in 1988. , it is the only nuclear-powered merchant ship in service.

Civilian nuclear ships suffer from the costs of specialized infrastructure. The Savannah was expensive to operate since it was the only vessel using its specialized nuclear shore staff and servicing facility.  A larger fleet could share fixed costs among more operating vessels, reducing operating costs.

Despite this, there is still interest in nuclear propulsion. In November 2010 British Maritime Technology and Lloyd's Register embarked upon a two-year study with U.S.-based Hyperion Power Generation (now Gen4 Energy), and the Greek ship operator Enterprises Shipping and Trading SA to investigate the practical maritime applications for small modular reactors. The research intended to produce a concept tanker-ship design, based on a 70 MWt reactor such as Hyperion's. In response to its members' interest in nuclear propulsion, Lloyd's Register has also re-written its 'rules' for nuclear ships, which concern the integration of a reactor certified by a land-based regulator with the rest of the ship. The overall rationale of the rule-making process assumes that in contrast to the current marine industry practice where the designer/builder typically demonstrates compliance with regulatory requirements, in the future the nuclear regulators will wish to ensure that it is the operator of the nuclear plant that demonstrates safety in operation, in addition to the safety through design and construction. Nuclear ships are currently the responsibility of their own countries, but none are involved in international trade. As a result of this work in 2014 two papers on commercial nuclear marine propulsion were published by Lloyd's Register and the other members of this consortium. These publications review past and recent work in the area of marine nuclear propulsion and describe a preliminary concept design study for a  Suezmax tanker that is based on a conventional hull form with alternative arrangements for accommodating a 70 MWt nuclear propulsion plant delivering up to 23.5 MW shaft power at maximum continuous rating (average: 9.75 MW). The Gen4Energy power module is considered. This is a small fast-neutron reactor using lead–bismuth eutectic cooling and able to operate for ten full-power years before refueling, and in service last for a 25-year operational life of the vessel. They conclude that the concept is feasible, but further maturity of nuclear technology and the development and harmonisation of the regulatory framework would be necessary before the concept would be viable.

Nuclear propulsion has been proposed again on the wave of decarbonization of marine shipping, which accounts for 3–4% of global greenhouse gas emissions.

Merchant cargo ships
 , Japan (1970–1992; never carried commercial cargo, rebuilt as diesel engine powered RV Mirai in 1996)
 , Germany (1968–1979; re-powered with diesel engine in 1979)
 , United States (1962–1972)
 Sevmorput, Russia (1988–present)

Icebreakers

Nuclear propulsion has proven both technically and economically feasible for nuclear-powered icebreakers in the Soviet, and later Russian, Arctic. Nuclear-fuelled ships operate for years without refueling, and the vessels have powerful engines, well-suited to the task of icebreaking.

The Soviet icebreaker Lenin was the world's first nuclear-powered surface vessel in 1959 and remained in service for 30 years (new reactors were fitted in 1970). It led to a series of larger icebreakers, the 23,500 ton  of six vessels, launched beginning in 1975. These vessels have two reactors and are used in deep Arctic waters. NS Arktika was the first surface vessel to reach the North Pole.

For use in shallow waters such as estuaries and rivers, shallow-draft, Taymyr-class icebreakers were built in Finland and then fitted with their single-reactor nuclear propulsion system in Russia. They were built to conform to international safety standards for nuclear vessels.

All nuclear-powered icebreakers have been commissioned by the Soviet Union or Russia.
  (1959–1989; museum ship)
  (1975–2008; inactive, decommissioned)
  (1977–1992; scrapped)
  (1985–2013; inactive, decommissioned)
  (1986–present)
  (1989–present)
  (1990–present)
  (1990–2014; decommissioned)
 , formerly Ural (2007–present)
  (2020–present)
  (2021–present)
  (2022–present)

See also
 List of United States Naval reactors
 Naval Reactors
 Nuclear navy
 United States Naval reactor
 United States Navy Nuclear Propulsion
 Knolls Atomic Power Laboratory
 Soviet naval reactor
 Army Nuclear Power Program
 Naval Nuclear Power School
 
 Air-independent propulsion
 Russian floating nuclear power station
 Environmental impact of shipping
 Aircraft Nuclear Propulsion
 Nuclear-powered aircraft

References

 AFP, 11 November 1998; in "Nuclear Submarines Provide Electricity for Siberian Town," FBIS-SOV-98-315, 11 November 1998.
 ITAR-TASS, 11 November 1998; in "Russian Nuclear Subs Supply Electricity to Town in Far East," FBIS-SOV-98-316, 12 November 1998.
 Harold Wilson's plan BBC News story

External links
 The World Nuclear Association
 Naval Nuclear Power Training Command

Marine propulsion
 

Marine propulsion